Graham v. Richardson, 403 U.S. 365 (1971), was a United States Supreme Court case in which the Court determined that state restrictions on welfare benefits for legal aliens but not for citizens violated the Equal Protection Clause of the Fourteenth Amendment. The Court invalidated an Arizona law that required citizenship or 15 years of residence to receive welfare benefits. The 9–0 decision was written by Harry A. Blackmun.

The state argued that rational basis review should apply, which would require the non-citizen to prove that the law served no conceivable legitimate state interest, or alternatively that the law was not rationally related to the government's purpose. However, the court applied the strict scrutiny standard, holding, "Aliens as a class are a prime example of a 'discrete and insular' minority for whom such heightened judicial solicitude is appropriate."

References

External links
 

1971 in United States case law
United States Supreme Court cases
United States Supreme Court cases of the Burger Court